Mike Bocchetti (born April 3, 1961) is an American stand-up comedian, actor, and writer from Staten Island, New York. He is most notable for his role as the announcer on The Artie Lange Show from 2012 to 2014, and has acted frequently on film and television.

Bocchetti released a comedy album, Thank You, on Stand Up! Records in 2019.

Early life
Bocchetti was born on April 3, 1961 in Staten Island to a Catholic Italian family of what he once called "a very humble blue-collar background". He is the oldest of five children. He graduated from Tottenville High School in 1979. Often bullied as a child for being overweight, he was inspired to become a comedian after hearing Redd Foxx and realizing that the audience was laughing with, not at, Foxx.

He joined the Marines in 1980 but washed out after a few weeks; he wrote about the experience for his 2019 stage show Space Cookie.

Career

Stand-up comedy/stage
Bocchetti started performing comedy in 1992 and has performed on New York-area stages for decades, including the Staten Island Comedy Festival and New Jersey music festival The Bamboozle.

Television, radio, and podcasts
Bocchetti was the announcer on DirectTV's The Artie Lange Show (originally titled The Nick & Artie Show) from 2012 to 2014. He had been friends with Lange since the 1990s as a fellow stand-up comic; before they were famous, Lange once told Bocchetti, "If I'm ever on TV as a talk show host, you are my Ed McMahon." He has worked with Lange often after the show's cancellation.

Bocchetti's television work includes appearances on two seasons of NBC's Last Comic Standing in 2003 and 2006. He played a homeless man in the 2004 Monk episode "Mr. Monk Takes Manhattan". He appeared on the Louis C.K. series Louie in 2015. He was a guest on 25 episodes of Mary Dimino's New York-area cable-TV series Nights With Mary between 2003 and 2012.

He is a frequent guest on talk-radio shows and podcasts including The Howard Stern Show and Opie and Anthony, as well as The Jim Breuer Show, The Chip Chipperson Podcast, The Anthony Cumia Show,  and The Slant.

In 2009, Bocchetti starred in a short documentary directed by Lee Schloss, Who Is Mike Bocchetti?, covering his career and work with Lange, and including interviews with comedians including Colin Quinn.

He formed a production company with comedian Ken Burmeister, Blasted Films, which made Tubby Man: Hero of the Bullied, a semi-autobiographical comedy web series with an anti-bullying message, for Blip TV in 2013.

In 2014, Bocchetti started his own podcast, The Mike Bocchetti Show, which ran for 13 episodes.

In December 2019, he began co-hosting a new podcast with Lange, Artie Lange's Halfway House. Lange suspended the podcast in February 2020.

Film
In 2002, Bocchetti played one of the Grand Masters of the Illuminati in avant-garde artist Matthew Barney's film Cremaster 3. Other film work includes the 2003 indie comedy Chooch and 2020 Christina Ricci drama Faraway Eyes.

Albums
Bocchetti's debut album, Thank You, was released in 2019 on Stand Up! Records. Comedy website Laughspin compared Thank You favorably with Rodney Dangerfield's darkly self-deprecating persona, as did Richard Lanoie of The Serious Comedy Site, who also felt that Bocchetti "is not for the casual comedy fan and requires some patience to really appreciate."

Books and writing
In 2018, Bocchetti published an autobiography, Still Standing, covering his life from childhood through his 2017 heart attack.

In 2015, he wrote an ongoing interview column, The Bocchetti Files, for website The Interrobang.

Discography
Mike Bocchetti, Thank You (Stand Up! Records, 2019)

Personal life
Bocchetti was diagnosed with obsessive–compulsive disorder at age 26 and is a recovering alcoholic who has been sober since 1997. He had a heart attack in 2017.

References

External links
Official Mike Bocchetti website
Mike Bocchetti at Stand Up! Records website
 

Living people
American stand-up comedians
American male television actors
Comedians from New York (state)
Comedians from New York City
Stand Up! Records artists
American male comedians
20th-century American comedians
21st-century American comedians
1961 births
American male film actors
American radio personalities
Television personalities from New York City
American people of Italian descent
American podcasters
People from Staten Island